Marchwiel Hall is a Grade II listed building in the village of Marchwiel, Wrexham County Borough in North Wales.

History
Marchwiel Hall was a seat of the Broughton family and by 1837 was occupied by Townshend Mainwaring, who then moved to Galltfaenan Hall on his marriage. In 1883, its then owner, civil engineer Benjamin Piercy laid out a cricket ground. In 1913, Sir Alfred McAlpine bought the property. Home to the Marchwiel and Wrexham Cricket Club, Alfred developed it as "one of the most picturesque settings for playing the game in the country".

References

Houses in Wrexham
Country houses in Wales
Grade II listed buildings in Wrexham County Borough